Lee Pelekoudas is a former executive with the Seattle Mariners Major League Baseball club, most notable for serving as the club's interim general manager from June 16 to October 21, .

Biography 
He is of Greek descent and the son of former MLB umpire Chris Pelekoudas. He grew up in Sunnyvale, California.

Pelekoudas was selected by the Montreal Expos in the 48th round of the 1969 amateur draft, but attended Arizona State University instead. He has held various front office positions with the Mariners since 1979.

Pelekoudas was the Mariners' associate GM under Bill Bavasi when the latter was dismissed on June 16, and Pelekoudas was named interim GM by team CEO Howard Lincoln and president Chuck Armstrong. During his tenure as interim GM, several of the field personnel who had become scapegoats for the team's poor performance during the 2008 season were dismissed, including hitting coach Jeff Pentland, field manager John McLaren, first baseman Richie Sexson, and designated hitter José Vidro.

He returned to his former position when Jack Zduriencik was hired as the Mariners' general manager on October 21, and resigned from the Mariners on September 1, 2009.

References

Year of birth missing (living people)
Living people
Major League Baseball general managers
Seattle Mariners executives